Ernest Stanley Elder (13 December 1916 – 4 December 2007) was an  Australian rules footballer who played with Hawthorn in the Victorian Football League (VFL).

Notes

External links 

1916 births
2007 deaths
Australian rules footballers from Melbourne
Hawthorn Football Club players
People from Hawthorn, Victoria